Mu Shiying (March 14, 1912 – June 28, 1940) was a Chinese writer who is best known for his modernist short stories. He was active in Shanghai in the 1930s where he contributed to journals like Les Contemporains (1932-1935), edited by Shi Zhecun.

Early life
Mu's family came from Cixi, Ningbo, Zhejiang. His father, Mu Jingting (1877–1933) was a banker and gold speculator, who apparently had died of exhaustion and depression after losing money in bad speculations. His mother was Shi Cuifeng (1895-1940). In his childhood, his family had already moved to Shanghai.

As a college student, Mu studied Chinese literature at Guanghua University in Shanghai.

In 1930, as a college student, he submitted a short story, "Our World" to La Nouvelle Littérature (1929–1930), a journal that was edited by Shi Zhecun, He Dong, Liu Na'ou, Dai Wangshu, and Xu Xiacun. The work was praised by the editors and Mu Shiying became a protégé of Shi Zhecun. Mu became good friends with Liu Na'ou and Dai Wangshu, both of whom were major contributors to the literary movement known as New Sensualism or the New Sensationists (also see as: Shinkankakuha). This was an offshoot of a movement in Japan that borrowed from styles of literary modernism that were being developed in Europe and America. In time, Mu became the leading exemplar of this style.

Career
Mu wrote over 50 short stories, several novels, screenplays, and numerous essays during his short lifetime. Among his most celebrated short stories are "Shanghai Fox-trot," "Craven A," and "Five in a Nightclub." Mu had a fascination for the city's cabaret culture and was reportedly a fantastic and avid dancer. His short stories conveyed in dream-like fashion the experience of living in the modern city and included many episodes in nightclubs and cabarets. He often focused on the tangled and tortuous relationships between his male narrator and a femme-fatale that he was chasing. One early example of this is "The Man Who Was Treated as a Plaything." He also wrote about the sensual aspects of women and their bodies in inventive ways, as in the case of the dance hostess "Craven A."

Mu pursued a Cantonese dance hostess named Qiu Peipei and eventually married her (see photo). However, they had a falling out. In 1936, Mu Shiying moved to Hong Kong to pursue his estranged wife. He stayed in Hong Kong, but he returned to Shanghai at the invitation of Liu Na'ou who was working with the Japanese. In 1939, Mu became the general manager of a collaborationist newspaper under Wang Jingwei's collaborationist government.

Death
In 1940, while riding a rickshaw to his office, Mu was shot by assassins who were working for Chiang Kai-shek's underground resistance forces, and he died of blood loss on the way to the hospital. While rumors later suggested that Mu was a double agent, there has been no firm evidence of such a claim.

Writing style
Mu Shiying is one of the famous writers of the New Sensualism, he had a dandyish image which was reinforced by his writings — often set in the dance halls of Shanghai. His most famous short stories are highly modernist pieces that attempt to convey the fragmented and inhuman nature of modern life in the metropolis. They experiment with expressionistic narrative techniques that break with a standard textual flow by juxtaposing disconnected visual images.

In his story "Shanghai Fox-trot" (Chinese: 上海狐步舞; pinyin: Shànghǎi húbùwǔ), Mu gave a "film-like" description on the life in Shanghai, especially the life in night.

In the story "The Lady in the Inky-Green Cheongsam" (Chinese: 墨綠衫的小姐; pinyin: Mòlǜ shān de xiǎojiě), Mu showed the fascination with exotic themes and locations, which was a popular culture in Shanghai during the 1930s.

Xun Si, a 1940s Chinese literary historian described him as "A belly full of Horiguchi Daigaku style witticisms, a Yokomitsu Riichi style of writing, a Hayashi Fusao style of creating new narrative forms, such is the content of Mr. Mu Shiying."

Legacy
Poshek Fu of the University of Illinois discusses, and Margaret Blair portrays, the complex political situation faced by Mu and other modernist writers of the 1930s. Andrew David Field has written a lengthy appreciation of Mu's life and times and together with co-translator Hong Yu offers five original translations of Mu's short stories in his book Mu Shiying: China's Lost Modernist, including "The Man Who Was Treated as a Plaything," "Craven A", "Night," "Black Peony," and "Shanghai Fox-trot," along with a translation of "Five in a Nightclub" by Randolf Trumbull.

References

 Poshek Fu. Passivity, Resistance and Collaboration, Intellectual Choices in Occupied Shanghai 1937-1945, Stanford University Press, 1993.
 Leo Ou-fan Lee. Shanghai Modern. Cambridge MA: Harvard University Press, 1999.
Anthony Wan-hoi Pak. The School of New Sensibilities in the 1930s, a study of Liu Na'ou and Mu Shiying's fiction. Ottawa: National Library of Canada, 1995.
Andrew David Field, Mu Shiying: China's Lost Modernist. Hong Kong: Hong Kong University Press, 2014.
Shih, Shu-mei. The lure of the modern: writing modernism in semicolonial China, 1917-1937. University of California Press, 2001. 
Macdonald, Sean (2004). "The Shanghai Foxtrot (a Fragment) by Mu Shiying: Introduction". Modernism/modernity. 11 (4): 797–807. . .
Rosenmeier, Christopher (2017-08-01). "Tradition and Hybridity in Shi Zhecun and Mu Shiying", On the Margins of Modernism, Edinburgh University Press, .
Green, Frederik H. "Mu Shiying: China's Lost Modernist—New Translations and an Appreciation". MCLC Resource Center. 2014-08-19. 
Wang, Qin (2019-08-28), "Touch, Body, and the New Perceptionism: Mu Shiying's Case", Configurations of the Individual in Modern Chinese Literature, Singapore: Springer Singapore, pp. 167–226, .
Braester, Yomi (1995). "Shanghai's Economy of the Spectacle: The Shanghai Race Club in Liu Na'ou's and Mu Shiying's Stories". Modern Chinese Literature. 9(1): 39–57. .
Bevan, Paul (2020). "'Molü shan de xiaojie' 墨綠衫的小姐 (The Lady in the Inky-Green Cheongsam) by Mu Shiying", 'Intoxicating Shanghai' – An Urban Montage. BRILL, pp. 186–196, 2020-04-07, .
Thornber, Karen L (2009). "Multiple Vectors and Early Interlingual Transculturations of Japanese Literature", Empire of Texts in Motion, Harvard University Asia Center, pp. 127–171, .

Further reading 
 Margaret Blair, Shanghai Scarlet, a historical novel 1920s–1940s, Trafford Publishing, 2012

1912 births
1940 deaths
Chinese male short story writers
Republic of China short story writers
Writers from Ningbo
Assassinated Chinese people
People murdered in China
20th-century Chinese short story writers
20th-century Chinese male writers
People from Cixi
Short story writers from Zhejiang
Deaths by firearm in China